Featherhead may refer to:

 Brain Featherhead, a fictional character in the Stare-Out animated sketches
 Featherhead (Blues Traveler), a fictional character in the song "The Poignant and Epic Saga of Featherhead and Lucky Lack"
 Prince Featherhead, a fictional character created by Andrew Lang